This is a list of notable events in music that took place in the year 1888.

Specific locations
1888 in Norwegian music

Events
January 5 – The Neues deutsches Theater, Prague, is inaugurated with a performance of Wagner's opera Die Meistersinger von Nürnberg.
April 11 – The Concertgebouw in Amsterdam is inaugurated.
June 29 – G. F. Handel's Israel in Egypt is recorded onto wax cylinder at The Crystal Palace in London, the earliest known recording of classical music.
August 14 – A recording of Arthur Sullivan's "The Lost Chord" is played during a press conference introducing Thomas Edison's phonograph in London.
October 5 – At the age of seven, George Enescu becomes the youngest student ever admitted to the Vienna Conservatory
Gustav Mahler completes a projected symphonic poem, Totenfeier (Funeral Rites). It will eventually become the opening movement of his Symphony No. 2.

Published popular music
 "Drill, Ye Tarriers, Drill"     anonymous possibly Thomas F. Casey
 "Over The Waves" ("Sobre las Olas")     w.m. Juventino Rosas
 "Where Did You Get That Hat?"     w.m. Joseph J. Sullivan
 "The Whistling Coon"     w.m. Sam Devere

Classical music
Johannes Brahms – Violin Sonata in D Minor (opus 108)
Cécile Chaminade – Scarf Dance, Callirhoe (ballet)
Claude Debussy - Arabesque No. 1, L. 66 for piano
Frederick Delius – Hiawatha (tone poem)
Gabriel Fauré – Requiem in D minor, Op. 48
César Franck
 Symphony in D Minor
 Psyché, a symphonic poem with choir (based on the Greek myth), premiere March 10 1888
Edvard Grieg
Lyric Pieces for Piano, Book IV
Peer Gynt Suite No. 1 Op. 46
Augusta Holmes – La Nuit et l'amour
Edwin Lemare
Andantino in D-flat, also known as Moonlight and Roses, Op. 83 No. 2
Gustav Mahler – 
Symphony No. 1
Lieder aus "Des Knaben Wunderhorn" (song collection)
Carl Nielsen – Suite for String Orchestra
Ignacy Jan Paderewski – Piano Concerto in A minor
Max Reger – String Quartet in D minor (with double bass obbligato; without op.) (1888–9)
Joseph Rheinberger – Organ Sonata No. 12 in D-flat, Op. 154
Nikolai Rimsky-Korsakov –
Sheherazade
Russian Easter Festival Overture
Erik Satie – Gymnopédie for piano
Richard Strauss
Don Juan, Macbeth and Death and Transfiguration (first version)
Pyotr Ilyich Tchaikovsky
Symphony No. 5
Hugo Wolf
Goethe-Lieder
Mörike-Lieder

Opera
Karel Miry – La Napolitaine (opera in 1 act, libretto by J. de Bruyne), premiered on February 25 in Antwerp
Emile Pessard – Tartarin sur les Alpes premiered on November 17 at the Théâtre de la Gaîté, Paris
Camille Saint-Saëns – Ascanio
Carl Maria von Weber, completed by Gustav Mahler – Die Drei Pintos

Musical theater
 The Yeomen of the Guard by W. S. Gilbert and Sir Arthur Sullivan, premiered on October 3 at the Savoy Theatre, London and on October 17 at the Casino Theatre (Broadway), New York

Births 
January 20 – Huddie William Ledbetter (Lead Belly), American folk and blues singer (d. 1949)
January 26 – Lisa Steier, Swedish ballerina (d. 1928)
February 9 – Ernst Mehlich, German-Brazilian conductor and composer (d. 1977)
February 27 – Lotte Lehmann, singer (d. 1976)
May 10 – Max Steiner, composer (d. 1971)
May 11 –  Irving Berlin, composer (d. 1989)
May 27 – Louis Durey, composer, member of Les Six (d. 1979)
June 3 – Tom Brown, jazz trombonist (d. 1958)
June 6 – Pete Wendling, American composer, pianist, and piano roll recording artist (d. 1974)
June 16 – Bobby Clark, American comedian and singer (d. 1960)
June 17 – Bernhard van den Sigtenhorst Meyer, Dutch composer (d. 1953)
June 25 – Rosalie Housman, American composer (d. 1949)
August 16 – Armand J. Piron, jazz musician (d. 1943)
September 12 – Maurice Chevalier, French singer and actor (d. 1972)
October 7 – Cecil Coles, composer (d. 1918)
November 16 – Luis Cluzeau Mortet, Uruguayan composer (d. 1957)
November 23 – Harpo Marx,  American comedian, film star, mime artist and musician (d. 1964)
December 28 – Gabriel von Wayditch, American composer of operas (d. 1969)

Deaths 
January 5 – Henri Herz, pianist and composer, 84
January 14 – Stephen Heller, pianist and composer, 74
February 7 – Aurore von Haxthausen, pianist and composer
February 22 – Jean-Delphin Alard, violinist and music teacher, 72
March 10 – Ciro Pinsuti, pianist and composer, 58
March 21 – Thomas German Reed, composer and theatre manager, 72
March 29 – Charles-Valentin Alkan, French pianist and composer, 74 (killed in freak accident, trapped beneath a falling coat-rack)
April 21 – Julius Weissenborn, bassoonist, 51
June 13 –  Timoteo Pasini, Italian composer, conductor, and pianist, 59 
August 8 – Friedrich Wilhelm Jähns, composer, music teacher and cataloguer, 79
August 31 – Blanche Cole, operatic soprano, 37 (dropsy)
November 17 – Jakob Dont, violinist and composer, 73
December 2 – Franz Xaver Witt, church musician and composer, 54
December 26 – Alfred Vance, English music hall singer and comedian, 49 (died on stage)

References

 
19th century in music
Music by year